is a public junior college in Miyako, Iwate, Japan. It was established in 1990, and has been attached to Iwate Prefectural University since 1998.

Departments
 Department of Management and Information studies

See also 
 List of junior colleges in Japan
 Morioka Junior College

External links
  

Public universities in Japan
Japanese junior colleges
Universities and colleges in Iwate Prefecture